Nadine Petra Katarina Shah (born 16 January 1986) is a British singer and songwriter.

Background
Shah was born in Whitburn, South Tyneside, to an English mother from South Shields of part Norwegian ancestry and a Pakistani father. She moved to London at the age of 17 to start her career as a jazz singer. Shortly after moving, she became close friends with Amy Winehouse.

Career

Her debut album, the Ben Hillier-produced Love Your Dum and Mad, was largely inspired by the tragic deaths of two young men. "There are two boys that this album is predominantly about," she continues. "During the period of time these songs were written two very close friends took their own lives." Shah is a keen speaker on the subject of social stigmas towards those suffering from mental health illnesses.

Shah and Hillier released their second record titled Fast Food in April 2015. She also made a guest appearance on two tracks of Ghostpoet's album, Shedding Skin, which was released in March 2015.

In February 2016, Hillier and Shah scored the music to the Northern Stage production of Get Carter. This included original pieces and the re-imagining of music by North East band The Animals.

Her album Holiday Destination was released in August 2017. It was again produced by Hillier, who also plays drums in Shah's live band. The album was nominated for a Mercury Prize in 2018.

The fourth studio album Kitchen Sink came out on 26 June 2020 and found much acclaim of critics. In some of the lyrics she considers what it means to be a thirtysomething woman today. 

Shah provided testimony to the UK government's Digital, Culture, Media and Sport Committee as part of an ongoing probe into the economics of music streaming in November 2020, citing a lack of transparency regarding musicians' royalty payments.

Artistry
Shah has been compared to other female artists such as PJ Harvey and Siouxsie and the Banshees, and is noted for the theatricality of her voice.

Personal life
An interview by John Freeman for The Quietus highlighted that "Mental health is a hugely important issue for Shah." Shah suffers from endometriosis. She identifies as a Muslim, and of her career in music, she said "[if] it inspires any young Muslim women to pick up a guitar and play a song, that’s brilliant". She is married to filmmaker Matthew Cummins. The couple live in Ramsgate, Kent.

Political views
In November 2019, along with 34 other musicians, Shah signed a letter endorsing the Labour Party leader Jeremy Corbyn in the 2019 UK general election with a call to end austerity. In 2020, she voiced her support for the newly-elected Labour Party leader Keir Starmer.

Discography
Albums
 Love Your Dum and Mad (July 2013)
 Fast Food (April 2015)
 Holiday Destination (August 2017)
 Kitchen Sink (June 2020, Infectious Music/BMG/Warner)

Extended plays
 Aching Bones (November 2012)
 Dreary Town (April 2013)

References

External links 
 
 
 
 Nadine Shah at AllMusic
 

1986 births
Living people
English songwriters
English people of Norwegian descent
English people of Pakistani descent
People from Whitburn, Tyne and Wear
Musicians from Tyne and Wear
British musicians of Pakistani descent
21st-century English women singers
21st-century English singers
Infectious Music artists
English Muslims